Sporadarchis is a genus of moths of the family Yponomeutidae.

Species
Sporadarchis galactombra - Meyrick, 1935 

Yponomeutidae